La Florida may refer to:

 Spanish Florida, the State of Florida and surrounding areas of the southeastern United States as a former Spanish territory
 Florida, a current U.S. State (Spanish name)
 La Florida (film), a 1993 Canadian film
 La Florida, a solar power plant in Alvarado, Badajoz, Spain

Geography 
 La Florida y Luisiana, a community in Cruz Alta Department, Argentina
 Club Social y Deportivo La Florida, a football team based in La Florida y Luisiana
 La Florida, Chile, a commune in Santiago Province
 La Florida, Nariño, a municipality in Nariño District, Colombia
 La Florida (wetland), a wetland and park in Funza, close to Bogotá
 La Florida District, a district of San Miguel Province, Peru
 La Florida (L'Hospitalet de Llobregat), a neighbourhood in the L'Hospitalet de Llobregat municipality, Catalonia, Spain
 La Florida (park) in Álava, Spain

See also 
 Florida (disambiguation)